James Joseph Heffernan (November 8, 1888  – January 27, 1967) was an American architect and politician who served six terms as a U.S. Representative from New York from 1941 to 1953.

Biography
James Joseph Heffernan was born in Brooklyn, New York on November 8, 1888.  He graduated from Bryant & Stratton College in 1906 and Pratt Institute in 1908, and became an architect.

Political career 
He was a leader in Brooklyn's Democratic Party, and was a Delegate to several state and national conventions.

Heffernan served as Brooklyn's Highway Commissioner from 1926 to 1933, and was a Delegate to the 1938 state constitutional convention.

Congress 
In 1940 he was elected to Congress as a Democrat.  He was reelected five times and served from  January 3, 1941 to January 3, 1953.  He did not run for reelection in 1952 and resumed working as an architect.

Death 
Heffernan died in Long Branch, New Jersey on January 27, 1967.  He was buried at Holy Cross Cemetery in Brooklyn.

His brother William J. Heffernan was also a political figure in Brooklyn.

References

Sources

James J. Heffernan at Political Graveyard

1888 births
1967 deaths
People from Brooklyn
Pratt Institute alumni
Architects from New York City
Democratic Party members of the United States House of Representatives from New York (state)
20th-century American politicians
Bryant and Stratton College alumni